The Gorongoza gerbil (Gerbilliscus inclusus) is a species of rodent found in Mozambique, Tanzania, and Zimbabwe. Its natural habitat is moist savanna.

References

Sources

Gerbilliscus
Mammals described in 1908
Taxa named by Oldfield Thomas
Taxonomy articles created by Polbot